Dante Mario Craig (born August 20, 1978) is an American former professional boxer who competed from 2001 to 2016. As an amateur, he competed at the 2000 Summer Olympics in Sydney, in the welterweight. Craig was born in Cincinnati, Ohio. He took up boxing at the age of 12 to defend himself against an older bully, and won a National Junior Olympic championship by age 15.

References

External links
 
 

1978 births
Living people
American male boxers
African-American boxers
Olympic boxers of the United States
Boxers at the 2000 Summer Olympics
Boxers from Cincinnati
Welterweight boxers
21st-century African-American sportspeople
20th-century African-American sportspeople